Kwabena Sarkodee Adjepong (born 24 April 1990), better known by his stage name Kwabs,  is an English singer and songwriter. He is best known for his international hit "Walk".

Early life
Born in London, Kwabs was raised in Bermondsey, Southwark, to Ghanaian parents. At The Charter School, his music teacher Xanthe Sarr and manager of the Southwark Youth Orchestra, introduced Kwabs to the National Youth Jazz Orchestra. Accepted in the programme, he became the lead singer of the orchestra for four years. He also studied jazz at the Royal Academy of Music.

Career

2011–12: Beginnings
In 2011, Kwabs was in the BBC television show Goldie's Band: By Royal Appointment of drum-and-bass musician Goldie, a UK nationwide platform to search for young talented musicians, and one of twelve artists chosen to create some musical pieces for a special performance at Buckingham Palace. This culminated in Kwabs appearing in a 2011 presentation, performing a rendition of "Sometimes I Feel Like a Motherless Child".

In 2012, he released cover versions of "Like a Star" by Corinne Bailey Rae and "The Wilhelm Scream" by James Blake. The Kwabs version went viral on YouTube. He signed a recording contract with Atlantic Records collaborating with a number of artists for his debut EP Wrong or Right with critical acclaim.

2014–present: Love + War

The subsequent EPs Pray for Love and Walk EP have a more pop-oriented sound, with Walk EP containing the hit single "Walk", Kwabs' best known release, launched on 5 October 2014 on Atlantic Records. It was a minor hit in the United Kingdom, reaching number 71, but became hugely popular in Germany, Austria and Switzerland. It was also number one on the iTunes Music charts.

In April 2015, Kwabs released the single "Perfect Ruin", and on 11 September 2015, he released his debut studio album Love & War.

In popular culture
"Saved" was used in a number of promotional trailers for the second series of the BBC's The Musketeers.
"Walk" was used in the soundtrack of EA Sports video game FIFA 15, along with promotional trailers for the BBC's coverage of the 2015 general election. It was also used in an ad for the WeAreUs August 2015 ad for Boohoo.com.

Discography

Studio albums

Extended plays

Singles

Non-charting
2014: "Fight for Love"
2014: "Pray for Love"
2015: "Perfect Ruin"
2015: "Look Over Your Shoulder"
2022: "Hurt A Little"

As featured artist

Music videos

References

Notes
A  Did not appear in the official Belgian Ultratop 50 charts, but rather in the bubbling under Ultratip charts. For Ultratip peaks, add 50 positions to arrive at an equivalent Ultratop position.

Sources

External links

1990 births
Living people
21st-century Black British male singers
English people of Ghanaian descent
British contemporary R&B singers
English male singer-songwriters
English soul singers
People from Bermondsey
Singers from London